The Home for Blind Women is a Canadian dramatic short film, directed by Sandra Kybartas and released in 1995. Based on a true story, the film is a mockumentary which stars Helen Carscallen and Susan Kottmann as two elderly women living in a group home for blind women, but exploring the building's more lurid history as a bordello.

The film's screenplay was written by Barbara Nichol.

The film premiered at the Cinéfest Sudbury International Film Festival in September 1995.

The film won the Genie Award for Best Theatrical Short Film at the 17th Genie Awards. At the San Francisco International Film Festival in 1996, the film won the Gold Spire Award for Best Film Under 15 Minutes.

References

External links
 

1995 films
1995 drama films
Best Theatrical Short Film Genie and Canadian Screen Award winners
1995 short films
Canadian Film Centre films
Canadian mockumentary films
1990s English-language films
Canadian drama short films
Canadian comedy short films
1990s Canadian films